This is a list of busiest London Underground stations for the 2020 calendar year. The dataset records patterns of mobility during the first year of the COVID-19 pandemic in the United Kingdom, with significantly reduced levels of mobility when compared with the 2019 data. Extended periods of significantly reduced commuting and other travel caused many major central London stations to drop in the ranking during 2020 and for larger suburban stations to replace them. 

The London Underground is a rapid transit system in the United Kingdom that serves London and the neighbouring counties of Essex, Hertfordshire and Buckinghamshire. Its first section opened in 1863. The system had 270 stations in 2020. In 2020, Stratford was the busiest station on the network, used by over 25.07 million passengers, while Kensington (Olympia) was the least used, with 40,000 passengers. Data for 2020 was published on 1 April 2021.

This table shows the busiest stations with over 10 million entries and exits in 2020.

See also
List of busiest London Underground stations for the 2021 data
List of busiest London Underground stations (2019)
List of London Underground stations
List of busiest railway stations in Great Britain (2020–21)

Notes

References

Busiest London Underground stations
Busiest London Underground stations